is a junction passenger railway station located in the city of Sagamihara, Kanagawa Prefecture, Japan, operated by the private railway operator Odakyu Electric Railway.

Lines
Sagami-Ōno Station is served by both the Odakyu Odawara Line and the Odakyu Enoshima Line.

Station layout
The station consists of two island platforms with six tracks, connected to the station building by footbridges. The two central tracks are used for non-stop train services. The station building is part of a large shopping mall, containing an Odakyu OX supermarket, Odakyu department store, a Bic Camera discount electronics store, and the Odakyu Hotel Century Sagami-Ono.

Platforms

History
It was renamed Sagami-Ōno on January 1, 1941, as part of the counter-intelligence movement to eliminate the names of military facilities from maps.

Station numbering was introduced in January 2014 with Sagami-Ōno being assigned station number OH28.

Passenger statistics
In fiscal 2019, the station was used by an average of 127,169 passengers daily.

The passenger figures for previous years are as shown below.

Surrounding area
Isetan Sagamihara (department store)
Okadaya MORE's
Minami Ward office
Sagami Women's University
Kitasato University (Sagamihara campus)
Joshibi University of Art and Design

Bus services
The following express bus services operate from the station.

 Narita Airport, operated jointly by Kanachu and Keisei Bus
 Haneda Airport, operated jointly by Kanachu and Keikyu Bus

See also
 List of railway stations in Japan

References

External links

Sagami-Ono Station 

Railway stations in Kanagawa Prefecture
Railway stations in Japan opened in 1938
Odakyu Odawara Line
Odakyū Enoshima Line
Railway stations in Sagamihara